Paul F. Lipscomb (January 13, 1923 – August 20, 1964) was an American football defensive lineman who played ten seasons in the National Football League for the Green Bay Packers, the Washington Redskins, and the Chicago Bears.  He played college football at the University of Tennessee.

1923 births
1964 deaths
Green Bay Packers players
Washington Redskins players
Eastern Conference Pro Bowl players
Tennessee Volunteers football players
People from Benton, Illinois